Jochen Wolf (26 August 1941 – 2 February 2022) was a German politician. A member of the Social Democratic Party of Germany, he served in the Landtag of Brandenburg from 1990 to 1994. He died in Brandenburg an der Havel on 2 February 2022, at the age of 80.

References

1941 births
2022 deaths
20th-century German politicians
Members of the Landtag of Brandenburg
Ministers of the Brandenburg State Government
People from Chemnitz
Social Democratic Party of Germany politicians